Route 215 is a two-lane north/south highway in Quebec, Canada. It starts in Sutton at the junction of Route 139 and links it to Brome and Fulford, in the northern part of Lac-Brome, where it ends at the junction of Route 243. It is the shortest link between Sutton and Autoroute 10.

Municipalities along Route 215
 Sutton
 Brome
 Lac-Brome

Major intersections

See also
 List of Quebec provincial highways

References

External links 
 Official Transport Quebec Road Map

215